Anousheh Khalili (born 1983) is an Iranian-American singer-songwriter. She is known for providing vocals and also appearing in the videos for Deep Dish's "Flashdance" and "Say Hello", the latter of which was nominated for a Grammy in 2006 in the Best Dance Recording category, and Sharam's "Fun".

She recorded her debut album on the indie label Triple Stamp Records. Her piano and vocal skills have been compared to the likes of Fiona Apple and Neko Case.

Albums 
 Let the Ground Know Who's Standing on Him (January 2005) – 34:53
 The Trouble I Find (October 2012) – 23:45
 Make Noise (February 2015) – 39:29

References

External links 
 

1983 births
Living people
American women singer-songwriters
American writers of Iranian descent
21st-century American singers
21st-century American women singers
American singer-songwriters